Attersee, also known as Kammersee, English sometimes Lake Atter, is the largest lake of the Salzkammergut region in the Austrian state of Upper Austria. It is Austria's third largest lake by area, surpassed only by Lake Constance and Lake Neusiedl, which, however, both extend beyond national borders.

Geography

The main inflow is the Seeache creek, which flows out of the nearby Mondsee lake in the southwest. Both Attersee and Mondsee are part of a chain of lakes, beginning with Fuschlsee and Irrsee. The waters flow off with the Ager River down to the Traun which itself discharges into the Danube at Linz.

Due to its steady winds and clean water quality, Attersee is famous for attracting sailors and swimmers alike.  During the season numerous sailing competitions are held. One of the most cherished winds on Attersee is the so-called "Rosenwind" meaning "breeze of roses". It is an easterly wind that crosses a castle's rose garden and fills the air across the lake with the smell of roses. The surrounding settlements largely depend on tourism, mainly in spring, summer and autumn.

Because of the lake's size and despite the cold temperatures during winter the lake rarely freezes. The last time the lake was entirely covered with ice was in the late 1940s, when people were seen skating and riding motorcycles across the thickly frozen surface of the lake.

History 

The name Atter, derived from ata meaning "water", probably is of proto-Celtic origin. The shores were already settled in the Neolithic era. In August 1870, remains of prehistoric pile dwellings were found near Seewalchen at the northern end of the lake. The Mondsee group stilt houses since 2011 are part of the UNESCO Prehistoric pile dwellings around the Alps World Heritage Site. Other archaeological findings denote settlement activities in Roman times from the 2nd century BC onwards.

In the middle of the 19th century paddlesteamers were introduced on the lake to ferry mail and goods between the villages located around the Attersee. Today it is an important recreation site for people from the urban areas of Vienna and Linz.

From the Fin de siècle, Attersee became a popular destination for summer guests, apart from the bustle at the emperor's sojourn in nearby Bad Ischl. Near the village of Litzlberg, part of Seewalchen, there is a small island castle, which Gustav Klimt frequently visited during the summer. Likewise, the German painter Albert Weisgerber was a summer visitor on Attersee.

Lake Attersee was a rallying point for several German divisions during World War II which had retreated during the Siege of Budapest.  Among these were several foreign volunteer divisions of the Waffen-SS, which sought to reach Attersee where surrender to the Americans was preferable to capture by the Red Army.

Fishing
Among the fish species found in the lake are:
 Northern pike
 Brown trout
 Rainbow trout
 Arctic char (Salvelinus alpinus)
 Lake char (Salvelinus umbla)
 European eel
 Carp
 Burbot
 Perch
 Whitefish

Panorama

Gallery

References

External links 

 AtterWiki - information Attersee and surrounding area (in German)
 Attersee-Attergau tourist information

Attersee